Kourou Station (also known as Kourou 93) is an ESTRACK satellite ground station in French Guiana.  Two antennas are located at the site: A 15-meter one that receives in X- and S-bands along with smaller 1.3-meter X-band acquisition aid antenna. Additional facilities provide tracking, telemetry, telecommand and radiometric measurements.

During its routine operations it is used for Launch and Early Orbit Phase communication as well as control of the XMM-Newton X-ray observatory. In 2009 new station for a support of Galileo satellites was inaugurated in Kourou Station.

References

External links
 Kourou station aerial view, 2007

European Space Agency
ESTRACK facilities
Guiana Space Centre
Buildings and structures in Kourou
Space program of France
Year of establishment missing